The Wilgus Site is a prehistoric Native American camp site in coastal Sussex County, Delaware, near Bethany Beach. The site is located along a now-inundated tributary of the Indian River, with the main living area of the camp on top of a low knoll. Evidence of the site indicates it was occupied during the Adena culture during the Early Woodland Period.

The site was listed on the National Register of Historic Places in 1978.

See also
National Register of Historic Places listings in Sussex County, Delaware

References

Archaeological sites on the National Register of Historic Places in Delaware
Sussex County, Delaware
National Register of Historic Places in Sussex County, Delaware